The Best of Doc Watson: 1964–1968 is the title of a recording by American folk music and country blues artist Doc Watson, released in 1999. It contains tracks from Watson's early years on the Vanguard label plus four previously unreleased tracks.

Track listing
 "Muskrat" (traditional) – 2:51
 "Country Blues" (Dock Boggs) – 3:29
 "Rising Sun Blues" (traditional) – 4:14
 "Tennessee Stud" (Jimmy Driftwood)  – 3:35
 "Down in the Valley to Pray" (traditional) – 1:59
 "Dill Pickle Rag" (traditional) – 1:21
 "Otto Wood the Bandit" (Walter "The Kid" Smith) – 3:13
 "Windy and Warm" (John D. Loudermilk) – 2:12
 "Little Sadie" (traditional) – 1:56
 "Blue Railroad Train" (Alton Delmore, Rabon Delmore) – 2:41
 "Omie Wise" (traditional) – 4:24
 "Intoxicated Rat" (Dorsey Dixon) – 2:29
 "Tom Dooley" (traditional) – 3:14
 "Alberta" (Lead Belly) – 2:40
 "Beaumont Rag" (traditional) – 1:39
 "Shady Grove" (traditional) – 2:55
 "My Rough and Rowdy Ways" (Elsie McWilliams, Jimmie Rodgers) –  2:29
 "The Train That Carried My Girl from Town" (traditional) – 3:44
 "Black Mountain Rag" (traditional) – 1:43
Previously unreleased tracks:
 "Grandfather's Clock" (Henry Clay Work) – 3:20
 "The Cyclone of Rye Cove" (Maybelle Carter) – 3:10
 "Doc's Guitar" (Doc Watson) – 1:23
 "Crawdad Hole" (traditional) – 3:51

Personnel
Doc Watson – guitar, harmonica, vocals
Merle Watson – guitar, banjo

References

1999 greatest hits albums
Doc Watson compilation albums
Vanguard Records compilation albums